Odin (Old Norse Óðinn) is a widely attested god in Germanic mythology. The god is referred to by numerous names and kenningar, particularly in the Old Norse record.

List 

See also
List of names of Thor
List of names of Freyr
List of kennings
Mercurius Cimbrianus
Names of God in Old English poetry
Godan and Wodan

Notes

Further reading

External links
MyNDIR (My Norse Digital Image Repository) Illustrations of Bǫlverkr from manuscripts and early print books. Clicking on the thumbnail will give you the full image and information concerning it.

Odin, names of